Fontanet may refer to:

 Fontanet, Indiana, an unincorporated census-designated place in Vigo County, Indiana
 José Fontanet (1900–1941), Spanish water polo player
 Joseph Fontanet (1921–1980), French politician
 Pedro Mata y Fontanet (1811–1877), Spanish medical doctor

See also
 Fontenet, a commune in the Charente-Maritime department in southwestern France